The LVOA-C is a variant of the AR-15 style rifle manufactured by North Carolina-based (now defunct) War Sport Industries. The LVOA family of weapons are semi automatic as opposed to fully automatic or select-fire. Making it unrelated to the M-4

Specifications 

The LVOA-C (manufactured by War Sport Industries by Inventor Joey Boswell) is a direct gas-impingement (DGI) operated rifle based on the AR-15. It features a proprietary barrel shroud with an integrated muzzle brake/flash suppressor, which serves its intended manufacturing purpose to be a close-quarter combat weapon with a low visibility operation application (LVOA). The sporting rifle features both chamber options of 5.56X45mm NATO rounds and .223 Wylde.

The LVOA-C weighs  unloaded ( with a 30-round magazine) and measures  in length ( with a closed stock). It has been widely used by private military companies for overseas and domestic operations due to its reliability, low recoil and visual signature.

History 
According to War Sport Industries, the rifle was developed as its support for "Low Visibility Operation / Applications for the modern war fighter." in an effort to provide a relevant response to the current unconventional warfare requiring high mobility and low visibility in confined environments. In 2018, War Sport was acquired by ZRODelta who now maintains the LVOA weapons line.

Media presence 
The LVOA-C has been highly advertised in video games and movies for its design and innovative proprietary barrel shroud. It is present in Ubisoft's Tom Clancy's The Division video game franchise and Tom Clancy's Ghost Recon Wildlands. It is also a weapon available in Tencent Games' battle royale shooter Ring of Elysium and Battlestate Games' Escape from Tarkov. There is a class setup in Call of Duty: Modern Warfare where version of the LVOA rifle can be created. In Call Of Duty Mobile, the Base M4 Model is a LVOA-C. Its media presence has been a major factor in the recent success of War Sport Industries, which saw its personnel roster growing from "two employees, to over twenty" from 2013 to 2016.

References 

5.56 mm assault rifles